Francis Phoebus (4 December 1467 – 7 January 1483) was King of Navarre (1479–1483), Viscount of Bearn, and Count of Foix (1472). He was the son of Gaston, Prince of Viana, and grandson of Queen Eleanor, whom he succeeded. She recommended him to ally with France.

His succession was approved by the Agramont party, while the Beaumont party fell behind Ferdinand the Catholic who started to build up political and military pressure on the Kingdom of Navarre in the run-up to the fully-fledged invasion of 1512.

During his brief reign, he was under the protection of his mother, the regent Magdalena of Valois. He died young while playing the pipe, arguably poisoned. He was buried in Lescar.

References

Sources
 

|-

1467 births
1483 deaths
15th-century Princes of Andorra
15th-century Navarrese monarchs
Navarrese monarchs
Francis Phoebus
Francis Phoebus
Princes of Andorra
Monarchs who died as children
Medieval child monarchs
Burials at Lescar Cathedral
Navarrese infantes